Fred or Frederick Anderson may refer to:

Politics 
 Fred Anderson (Canadian politician) (1878–1951), Canadian politician in Alberta
 Fred W. Anderson, Democrat member of Illinois House of Representatives in 1957
 Fred Anderson (Montana politician) (born 1944), Republican member of the Montana House of Representatives

Sports 
 Frederick Anderson (footballer) (1855–1940), Scottish footballer (national team) and businessman (chairman of the Shanghai Municipal Council)
 Fred Anderson (baseball) (1885–1957), Major League Baseball player (Boston Red Sox, Buffalo Bisons and New York Giants)
 Fred Anderson (footballer, born 1886) (1886–1963), Australian rules footballer for Essendon
 Fred Anderson (footballer, born 1931), Australian rules footballer for Fitzroy
 Fred Anderson (rugby league) (1933–2012), South African rugby player
 Fred Anderson (football owner) (died 1997), owned the Sacramento Surge (WLAF) and Sacramento Gold Miners (CFL)
 Fred Anderson (American football) (born 1954), National Football League defensive lineman
 Fred Anderson (cricketer) (born 1994), New Zealand cricketer

Others 
 Frederick C. Anderson (1842–1882), private in the American Civil War
 Frederick William Anderson (politician) (1883–1955), civil engineer, rancher and political figure in British Columbia
 Frederick William Anderson (geologist) (1905–1982), British geologist and palaeontologist
 Fred Anderson (musician) (1929–2010), American jazz saxophonist
 Fred Anderson (journalist) (1937–1996), American television news reporter
 Fred D. Anderson (born c. 1945), CFO of Apple Computer
 Fred Anderson (historian) (born 1949), American historian

See also
Alfred Anderson (disambiguation)
Fredrik Andersson (disambiguation)
Frederik Andersen (born 1989), Danish ice hockey player